Bradysia fungicola is a species of fly in the family Sciaridae. It is found in the  Palearctic.

References

Sciaridae
Insects described in 1867
Palearctic insects